Brettingham is a surname. Notable people with the surname include:

Matthew Brettingham (1699–1769), English architect
Matthew Brettingham the Younger (1725–1803), English architect
Robert Furze Brettingham (1750–1806), English architect

See also
 Brittingham (disambiguation)